Lesbenring e.V. is the most important lesbian organisation in Germany. The organisation was founded in 1982 and is headquartered in Heidelberg. 

Lesbenring works for the rights of lesbian women in Germany and fights for social equality. The organisation has around five thousand members. Lesbenring is a member of the International Lesbian and Gay Association (ILGA). Lesbenring has worked since 1990 together with the German LGBT organisation LSVD.

External links
 Official site of Lesbenring 

Lesbian organisations based in Germany
LGBT political advocacy groups in Germany